Tomoya  is a masculine Japanese given name.

Possible writings
Tomoya can be written using different combinations of kanji characters. Some examples:

友也, "friend, to be"
友矢, "friend, arrow"
友哉, "friend, how (interrogative particle)"
友弥, "friend, more and more"
友彌, "friend, more and more"
友八, "friend, eight"
友耶, "friend, question mark"
知也, "know, to be"
知矢, "know, arrow"
知哉, "know, how (interrogative particle)"
知弥, "know, more and more"
知八, "know, eight"
智也, "intellect, to be"
智矢, "intellect, arrow"
智哉, "intellect, how (interrogative particle)"
共也, "together, to be"
朋也, "companion, to be"
朝也, "morning/dynasty, to be"
朝矢, "morning/dynasty, arrow"
朝弥, "morning/dynasty, more and more"
朝彌, "morning/dynasty, more and more"

The name can also be written in hiragana ともや or katakana トモヤ.

Notable people with the name
, Japanese footballer
, Japanese footballer
, Japanese rugby union player
, Japanese footballer
, Japanese basketball coach
, Japanese baseball player
, Japanese politician
, Japanese baseball player
, Japanese footballer
, Japanese baseball player
, Japanese alpine skier
, Japanese Paralympic athlete
, Meiji-era politician
, Japanese footballer
, Japanese musician
, Japanese footballer
, Japanese modern pentathlete
, Japanese baseball player
, Japanese baseball player
, Japanese singer and actor
, Japanese actor
, Japanese footballer
, Japanese basketball player
, Japanese composer and musician
, Japanese footballer
, Japanese baseball player
, Japanese footballer
, Japanese footballer
, Japanese badminton player
, Japanese sprinter
, Japanese footballer
, Japanese footballer
, Japanese footballer
, Japanese actor
, Japanese baseball player
, Japanese sport shooter

Fictional characters
, protagonist of the visual novel Memories Off
, protagonist of the visual novel Clannad
, a character in the manga series Manga Mitaina Koishitai!

Japanese masculine given names